Bishop Giosuè Cattarossi was a late 19th century/early-mid 20th century Italian cleric. Born 23 April 1863 at Cortale, he was ordained a priest in April 1888, aged 24. On 11 April 1911 at the age of 48, he was appointed as Bishop of Albenga and ordained on 30 May of that year.

On 21 November 1913 at age 50, he was appointed as Bishop of Belluno e Feltre, Italy. As bishop, he ordained Albino Luciani, the future Pope John Paul I, to the priesthood in 1935. He died in 1944, aged 80, as Bishop of Belluno e Feltre. In total, he was a priest for 55 years and a bishop for 32 years.

References

1863 births
1944 deaths
People from the Province of Udine
Bishops of Albenga
Bishops of Belluno
20th-century Italian Roman Catholic bishops
Bishops appointed by Pope Pius X